Harpalus basuto is a species of ground beetle in the subfamily Harpalinae. It was described by Basilewsky in 1958.

References

basuto
Beetles described in 1958